Banangui, also spelled Banangi, is a village located in Haut-Mbomou Prefecture, Central African Republic.

History 
An armed group raided Banangui and looted civilian properties on 12 March 2017. On 17 May 2017, LRA militias attacked Banangui. They abducted 16 people and looted food from the village. Later, four men escaped and LRA released all women hostages. On 22 November 2018, a clash between Anti-balaka and UPC caused the villagers to flee Banangui and seek refuge in Dembia.

Facility 
Banangui has two health posts.

References 

Populated places in Haut-Mbomou